Amblyseius neolargoensis is a species of mite in the family Phytoseiidae.

References

neolargoensis
Articles created by Qbugbot
Animals described in 1965